Helena Modjeska Chase Johnson Drea (born Helena Modjeska Chase, September 23, 1900 - December 22, 1986) was an accomplished artist, writer, poet, musician, photographer and horsewoman. She was best known as an illustrator of children's books and for her oil paintings. Many of her books have found a place in the Library of Congress.

Early life

Helena Modjeska Chase was born in Omaha, Nebraska, on September 23, 1900. Her father Clement Chase was a prominent publisher in Omaha. Her paternal grandfather, Colonel Champion Spaulding Chase, was an attorney and the Mayor of Omaha, Nebraska and Chase County the village of Champion were named after him,

Her mother, Lula Belle Edwards Chase, was a socialite in Omaha who descended from five Mayflower ancestors, including among them Governor William Bradford, John Howland and Elizabeth Tilley who came to the New World on the English ship in 1620. Her maternal grandfather, Colonel Edward Eugene Edwards, was a California State senator. 

She was the forth and youngest child of Champion Clement Chase and Lula Belle (Edwards) Chase. Her father, Clement Chase, was a distinguished newspaper man as Editor of Omaha's "Excelsior" from Omaha, Nebraska and also owned a bookstore Her parents had a delightful home, with opportunities of meeting guests from everywhere, especially artists, writers, actors and dancers because they entertained a great deal.

Helena Modjeska Chase was the godchild and was named after the renowned Polish actress Helena Modjeska.

The distinguished Polish actress Helena Modjeska, her beloved godmother and namesake, was a renowned Shakespearean actress who specialized in trajic roles whose talent and grace captivated audiences around the world. She was a cherished friend of the great pianist and esteemed President of Poland, Paderewski, with whom she shared a deep and abiding passion for the arts. Today, a priceless relic of this magical era can still be found in the comfort of her home nestled in the breathtaking Catskill Mountains - Paderewski's concert grand piano, an exquisite testament to the enduring power and beauty of music.

Mrs. Lula Belle Edwards Chase (Helena's mother), when a girl, lived on a ranch in California adjoining the home of Madame Helena Modjeska, who was the mother of Ralph Modjeska.

Her grandfather Col. Champion Spaulding Chase had been mayor of Omaha, Nebraska, USA, and her parents entertained a great deal. The illustrious legacy of her family was further enriched by her grandfather, the distinguished Champion Chase, who brought the magic of Wagnerian Operas to the charming city of Omaha, casting a spell of enchantment and wonder upon all those who were fortunate enough to experience the breathtaking spectacle of this timeless art form. Through his unwavering dedication to the arts and his unyielding passion for excellence, he played a pivotal role in shaping the cultural landscape of his community, and inspiring countless others to follow in his footsteps and pursue their own passions and dreams.

Schooling

After kindergarten and public school, Miss Helena Chase attended Brownell Hall, an Episcopal Church School for young ladies three miles north of Omaha as well as studied at the Art Institute in Chicago during the summers of 1913 and 1914 in the regular summer school of art that was held there.

In November of 1915, at the young age of 14, Miss Helena Chase showed that she had already inherited her mother's gifts of artistic ability. In fact both their artistic triumphs were often displayed at the same time. Her mothers water color work along with her daughter Miss Helena's small statuette in plaster work in bronze effect, called "Day Dreams" which had been moulded by nimble and clever fingers to form book rests and had the image of a little girl with her doll and book. They had both taken arts lessons at the art institute in Chicago.

In February of 1916 Helena Chase was studying at the Latin school on the North Side of Chicago. Miss Helena M. Chase took art lessons and dancing lessons at the Chamber's Academy Ballroom also attended at the Mary C. Wheeler School in Providence, Rhode Island, and was elected one of the editors of the Quill, the school magazine in 1916. While there she had also been published as winning in tennis doubles matches.

On September 20 1917, Miss Helena Chase at the age of 16, designed a special poster of a crèche for use in raising funds for Unit No.1 of the baby aid work from the American Fund for French Wounded Civilian Relief. This poster was selected at the New York exhibition without the committee knowing it was the work of a 16-year-old girl, and was shown at the Corcoran art gallery in Washington.

In the height of summer, in the year of 1965, the remarkable Mrs. Helena Chase Johnson achieved a significant milestone in her lifelong pursuit of education, receiving her coveted Master of Arts Degree in Education from the esteemed Putney Graduate School of Teacher Education, nestled in the serene and picturesque community of Putney, Vermont. As part of her arduous journey to this great accomplishment, she dedicated herself to writing an awe-inspiring thesis on the art of children from all corners of the globe, a remarkable feat that exemplifies her boundless passion and devotion to the field of education. To achieve this, she embarked on a remarkable odyssey, traveling from the idyllic landscapes of Europe all the way to the enchanting lands of India, and then on through the vast and exotic terrain of Africa, and finally through the mystifying countries of the Eastern block. On this world study trip she visited 38 countries, including countries behind the Iron Curtain, she studied methods of teaching Art and Life of Children. Accompanying her on this epic journey was her dear sister, Carmelita Hinton, who was the illustrious founder of the renowned Putney School. Through her unwavering commitment to her studies and her unquenchable thirst for knowledge, Mrs. Helena Chase Johnson cemented her place in the annals of history as a true visionary in the field of education.

Her illustrious teaching career boasts a rich tapestry of experience, including guiding students through the creative realm of the Art Department at Putney School and Hickory Ridge School in Vermont, as well as taking on the prestigious role of acting head of the Art Department at Perry-Mansfield Camp nestled in the breathtaking vistas of Steamboat Springs, Colorado.

The family was fortunate in that her father owned several banking papers and a 'Weekly Society' paper; the advertisers therein often paid in the form of free lessons, clothing, groceries, hats, dentistry, and other necessities. At the age of 11 Chase studied at the Art Institute of Chicago, followed by the Chicago Girls' Latin School; Mary C. Wheeler School, Providence, Rhode Island; Woodstock, New York, Art Students' League; Colorado Springs Art Center; Parsons Art School, and other establishments.

She went to Omaha Public Schools, Brownell Hall, Chicago Girls Latin School, Art Institute of Chicago (Juvenile Dept.), Mary C. Wheeler School in Providence R.I., Chicago Art Institute, and the New York School of Fine and Applied Arts where she graduated in 1923. She married Harry McClure Johnson in 1923 just after graduation and then moved to Winnetka, Illinois.

Marriage

In the year of 1923, she joined in holy matrimony with the esteemed Harry McClure Johnson, a notable trademark attorney of great renown in both New York and Chicago. He was a graduate of Princeton university. Together, they took up residence in a magnificent mansion of grandeur and elegance, nestled in the charming community of Winnetka, Illinois. And in keeping with their illustrious status, they were attended to by a retinue of dutiful and skilled servants, ensuring that their every need was met with grace and sophistication.

Death of Husband

Even though their house was in Winnetka near Chicago, Illinois, Mrs. Helena Chase Johnson and her children spent the summer months of 1933 at her home on part of the Henry Cook ranch in Steamboat Springs, Colorado.

On March 29, 1932, Helena's husband and father to their 5 children, Harry McClure Johnson, died at the young age of 46 years old in Toronto, Canada. He was at the time of death a patent attorney and member of the law firm Ofield, Mehlhope, Scott & Poole.

Helena Chase now Helena Johnson was widowed in 1932 when her husband Harry McCLure Johnson died leaving behind five small children, Helena age 7, McClure age 6, Elizabeth age 5, Sarah Jane age 2 and Priscilla only 4 months old. Following the heartbreaking loss of her beloved husband, she embarked on a courageous journey with her five young children, all of whom were under the tender age of eight. Seeking solace and a fresh start, she made her way to the serene and picturesque community of Steamboat Springs, where she initially shared her artistic talents as a teacher at the Perry Mansfield Camp.  In addition to her inspiring work with aspiring artists, she also dedicated herself to the loving care and upbringing of her cherished family, settling into a sprawling 1,000-acre horse ranch that she affectionately named Pine Springs Ranch. This Pine Springs Ranch was 6 miles from Steamboat, Springs, Colorado. This idyllic retreat, perched atop the side of the majestic Mount Werner, was truly a rustic paradise, and it provided the perfect backdrop for her to heal, grow, and thrive alongside her beloved children.

Helena had 5 children in 8 years and was widowed at the age of 31 (when Harry Johnson died). After the death of her husband, Harry Johnson, she moved with her five children to Steamboat Springs, Colorado. She purchased a ranch at Steamboat Springs, Colorado (after selling her Winnetka, Illinois mansion) so that her oldest daughter, Mansi, could attend the Perry Mansfield Girls Camp which offered music, dance and theater programs. She taught art at the Perry Mansfield Camp and she raised her 5 children on a 1000-acre horse ranch which they called "Pines Spring Ranch."

With a fierce determination and an unwavering love for these majestic creatures, she set out to build her own impressive herd of horses. Her journey began with a daring adventure, as she embarked on a wild horse roundup in the untamed Sand Wash country, spanning the rugged terrain between Utah and Colorado. There, she found a striking black filly, wild and untamed, and she brought her back to her ranch to join her budding herd. Over time, this remarkable filly proved to be a remarkable asset, producing a stunning brood of palomino offspring, each as beautiful and spirited as their fearless mother. Some of these young palomino stallions were sold from the Pine Springs Ranch.

By 1935 she had a winter home at La Jolla, California. In 1939, Helena Chase Johnson bought "The Little Hotel by the Sea" (now called the Grande Colonial Hotel) in La Jolla, CA and named it "La Posada". It had seven small rooms for guests. After renovations she owned and operated the hotel for more than 25 years. It was known as the "Smallest hotel in the World with an Elevator" as its elevator held six people and was made of solid mahogany wood. After renovating the hotel, Helena C. Johnson and her 5 children opened the hotel with a grand opening celebration in 1940. They also had their two small Shetland ponies called Peanuts and Pardner help as official greeters in the hotel. These two ponies were considered as part of the family and were included in everything such as parties, birthday celebrations, holidays, and daily evening suppers.

In 1945, Mrs. Helena Chase Johnson and her daughters spent the winter in Putney, Vermont and spent the summer at the Pine Spring ranch in Steamboat.
 

In 1944, Mrs. Helena Chase Johnson and her children spent the summer at their Pine Spring ranch in Steamboat Springs after spending the winter in Colorado Springs.
 

The Pine Springs Ranch had the Continental Divide as a backyard. It used to be called Storm Mountain but now it is called Mount Warner and is a famous ski area. When World War II broke out she rented out her farm in Vermont and went into buying and selling property, and wrote a book "Horse Trading in Houses".

She started her large herd of horses initially by going on a wild horse roundup in the Sand Wash country between Utah and Colorado and brought back a wild black filly who produced palomino offspring. She loved adventure, was a colorful, courageous and adventure-loving person who took cold weather and hardships in her stride and would rather ski up a mountain than down it. With a fearless spirit and a love for adventure, she took to the wild and rugged terrain on horseback, accompanied by her trusted mustang and Arabian horses. She often had people come horseback riding with them to the top of Storm mountain (as it was called then) where the view was incredible, reaching as far as the eye can see into Wyoming and Utah.  Together, they embarked on countless pack trips, venturing high up into the rugged and awe-inspiring peaks of the Continental Divide, exploring the breathtaking expanse of the Mount Zirkel Wilderness area, and venturing deep into the mountains surrounding the charming community of Steamboat Springs, Colorado. Through it all, she reveled in the sheer joy of the journey, embracing the natural beauty of the land and forging an unbreakable bond with her magnificent steeds.

On occasion, Mrs. Helena Johnson found it necessary to sell a horse or pony to pay for a bill like the printing bills. She and her children found those kinds of partings very difficult and sad. She sold her Shetland ponies (Peanuts, Pardner and Popcorn) to the youngest son Hannes Von Trapp (of the Trapp family singers) up at Stowe, Vermont.

Poet and Writer

She was a published author of children's books, poems, and a children's juvenile magazine titled "Adventure Trails".

December 15 1962, Helena Chase Johnson had her poems printed in the fifth volume of Poetry "Skylines" which was distributed at local Colorado Springs book stores under the imprint of "The Gateway Press."

Her passion for artistic expression extended beyond her individual pursuits, as she found great joy and camaraderie among fellow members of the esteemed Penn Women of Colorado, the Quill Club of Colorado Springs, and the Poetry Fellowship of Colorado Springs, all of which she proudly belonged to. Her undeniable talent for verse and prose alike earned her widespread recognition and acclaim, as her poems graced the pages of countless esteemed papers and magazines. Furthermore, her dedication to the craft of writing extended far beyond mere publication, as she was an active member of several prominent writing organizations. In addition to her adult-focused work, she also made an indelible impact on the world of children's literature, having authored a series of beloved books and founded the delightful children's magazine "Adventure Trails" in the idyllic town of Steamboat Springs, Colorado. 

By 1946, the unique publishing venture of Adventure Trails had more than 20 books designed for children. The writers and illustrators were children as were the board of editors. Many were pocket sized, and many were in both English and Spanish. Helena C. Johnson was the only adult. Her daughter Mansie was the editor, son McClure was the science editor, daughter Sarah Jane was the business manager, and daughter Priscilla was the general assistant. The publishing house was horse ranch on the Western Slope on Steamboat. "Peanuts," the hero of one of the books was an actual pony that was a favorite of the Johnson children. These books were being sold not only in America but also in Ghent, Belgium, Spain, France, Mexico and New Zealand. They also had subscriptions in Canada, Nairobi, and East Africa.

She started the "Adventure Trails Publications" in 1945 at her ranch in Steamboat Springs. Her daughter, Elizabeth (then 19) wrote "The Vengeance of the Vixen" in 1945. Her daughter Priscilla (then 15) wrote and published "How the Eggplant Came to Be" Her daughter Elizabeth's book "The Travels of Chiquita" was printed in 1947. She was known to have published books under the pseudonym Charity Chase as in her book "Peanuts' (And cowboy Jimmy)".

An accomplished woman of many talents, she dedicated her time and energy to the arts in a multitude of ways. As a passionate lover of music, she served as an esteemed member of the board for the Colorado Springs Chorale and honed her own musical abilities as an amateur musician, mastering several instruments with grace and finesse, including the illustrious viola. Her exceptional skill on the instrument earned her the distinguished honor of serving as the third solo violist in the acclaimed Bach Brandenburg Concerto with the Putney Chamber Orchestra in Vermont, and she was also a valued member of the Putney Symphony Orchestra, under the esteemed direction of Norwood Hinkle.

Helena had a lifelong love for music which began at a tender age, as she first began to tinkle on the ivories of the piano in her childhood. As she matured, she explored the captivating sounds of the cello, honing her craft in California before moving on to new musical horizons. In an impressive display of versatility, she even took up the rhythmic beats of the drums, entertaining the crowds at Hull House in Chicago with her spirited playing. But it was her virtuosity on the banjo that truly shone, as she dazzled audiences as a standout member of the dance band at Mesa School, located near the charming town of Steamboat Springs, Colorado.

On January 7, 1968 Helena Chase Johnson Drea was represented as one of the poets belonging to the Annual Anthology of the poetry fellowship of Colorado Springs. She also designed the cover, printed in silver, for the 25th or silver issue of the editorial. 
On June 1, 1969 Helena Chase Drea won Honorable mention in the annual Nellie Budget Miller Poetry contest awards for her poem "Sha Jehan's Lament" in the serious contest.

On March 11, 1972, the poem called "Too Much!" was printed in the Colorado Springs Gazette-Telegraph.

On December 23 1972, Helena Chase J. Drea's poem called "Rejoice" from The Child's World was published in the Colorado Springs, Gazette-Telegraph.

She is listed in "Who's Who of American Women" and also of "Who's Who of Women in the West."

Artist Painter

In July of 1933, Mrs. Helena Chase Johnson hand painted a picture of an Indian papoose that she made when she was in Vernal, Utah watching the Indians give a Sun Dance. Her paintings have been exhibited across the US, winning many prizes, and her name has been listed in the "Dictionary of International Biography", "Who's Who in the West" and "Who's Who of American Women", amongst other biographical works. Mrs. Helena Chase Johnson had three oil portraits for the 1944 annual exhibit of the Denver Art Museum.

In August of 1949, Doll portraits painted by Helen Chase Johnson of Steamboat Springs, Colorado were on display in the children's department of the Denver public library. These included a painting of an old kid-bodied wax doll which was also in the library. Other portraits are those of a pair of 90 year old twin dolls from a library in Brattleboro, Vermont, and one of a doll in an elegant white costume which was housed in the Pioneer Museum in Colorado Springs. Many paintings done by Mrs. Johnson have been to illustrate stories that had been printed.

With an impressive and awe-inspiring artistic prowess, she hosted numerous intimate and captivating one-person art shows, where she showcased her exquisite and intricately detailed portraits and mesmerizing still life studies to the delight of all who attended. Her talent for photography was truly remarkable, as evidenced by the fact that her exceptional enlargements caught the discerning eye of the esteemed Kodak company, who handpicked them for their esteemed displays.

She was very active with her painting and writing throughout her life, Helena had a family of five children, 22 grandchildren and many great-grandchildren. Mrs. Drea's portraits and still lifes were showcased in numerous one-man exhibitions and exhibits throughout various locations in the United States.

2nd Marriage

Mrs. Helena Chase Johnson married for the second time at the Grace Episcopal Church in Colorado Springs on August 1, 1965 after being a widow for 33 years (from 1932 to 1965). She became the bride of Dr. William Francis Drea of Birmingham, Michigan. He was a well-known Colorado Springs Physician. Music on the organ for the wedding was performed by Dr. Julius Baird. She was given in marriage by her son-in-law, Gunther Paetsch. Her daughter, Priscilla Paetsch and the Paetsch children, Phebe Verena, Michaela Modjeska, Brigitte McClure and Johann Sebastian assisted at the reception following the ceremony at "The Pines" on Cheyenne Mountain where Helena lived and the couple would live. Also present were Mrs. Johnson's daughters - Mrs. Mansi Kern and children, Shawn, Thor, Anhara and Tanya of Santa Fe, New Mexico and Mrs. Sarah Jane Shaw, and son Timothy of Bozeman, Montana. Dr. William F. Drea was well known in medical circles and for his research on Tubercle Bacillus. He died in 1983. 

Mrs. Helena Johnson lived not only in Colorado Springs for many years but also at the "Signal Pine Farm" in Putney, Vermont. 

Mrs. Drea held memberships in the Quill Club and Poetry Fellowship located in Colorado Springs." 

A member of the Arabian Horse Association, Chase raised Polish-bred registered Arabian Horses. Over many years she bred and raised Shetland ponies and 2 wild Mustangs from Douglas Mountain, North West Colorado (she learned to ride by herself along with her five children). 

In later years, after bringing up five children, she joined the Putney Graduate School of Teacher Education's "World Study Trip", and received a Master of Education degree in 1958 from the Putney Graduate School of Teacher Education. During the preceding years, 1956–57, she traveled through 38 countries with a sleeping bag and tent, visiting Europe, the Middle East, Russia and Africa.

Winning recognition as an artist and writer, Chase has been a publisher of books for small children, Adventure Trails Publications. These have found a place in the Library of Congress, by request. Her book "The Child's World" appeared in 1971, and she has contributed to the anthologies "Timberlines" (1943–64), "Golden Harvest" (1921–71), "Quadrennium DI Polynesia" (1971), and " Skylines" (1964-79). Many of her poems have been set to music, and she has received a number of honors and awards for her work, of which she declares 'I can't remember most of them'.

From "The Child's World" she quotes her own verse:

She published children's books, poetry, and magazines, exhibited paintings in public libraries coast to coast, taught at Chutney, Vermont and Hickory Ridge Schools, and raised Mustangs, Palominos, and Arabian Horses on the old Rock Cliff Ranch and in Steamboat Springs, CO.

Real Estate

She often was an operator in real estate. In 1939, Helena Chase Johnson bought "The Little Hotel by the Sea" (now called the Grande Colonial Hotel) in La Jolla, CA and named it "La Posada". It had seven small rooms for guests. After renovations she owned and operated the hotel for more than 25 years. It was known as the "Smallest hotel in the World with an Elevator" as its elevator held six people and was made of solid mahogany wood. After renovating the hotel, Helena C. Johnson and her 5 children opened the hotel with a grand opening celebration in 1940. They also had their two small Shetland ponies called Peanuts and Pardner help as official greeters in the hotel. These two ponies were considered as part of the family and were included in everything such as parties, birthday celebrations, holidays, and daily evening suppers.

She studied Asiatic dancing, ballroom dancing, taught rhythms at Putney, and could play the piano, viola, banjo, drums.  She was interested in painting, writing, traveling, raising horses, real-estate, children's books, reading, art, and music. She was also very interested in her genealogy. She embarked on a world trip for a thesis on Children's Art and had been collecting children's things (dolls, etc.) since a child.

Chase had poems published in many papers and magazines. She was also an amateur musician herself playing several instruments, including the viola, on which she was 3rd Solo Violist in the Bach Brandenburg Concerto in the Putney Chamber Orchestra under Norwood Hinkle while living in Vermont. She also played the piano, cello, drums and banjo. She played the piano since she was a child and studied the cello in California. She played the drums in Hull House in Chicago and was a virtuoso banjo player.

With a compassionate heart and an unbreakable spirit, she carried within her a profound sense of concern for the state of the world, and a deep-seated empathy for those who were downtrodden and oppressed. She made it her life's mission to champion the cause of those who had been marginalized and overlooked by society, dedicating herself tirelessly to advancing the rights and wellbeing of those in need. With unwavering conviction and an unrelenting determination, she stood as a beacon of hope and a true force for good in the world, leaving an indelible mark on the hearts and minds of all those who were fortunate enough to cross her path.

She was a unitarian and a member of Woman's International League for Peace and Freedom. 

Helena Drea's sister, Carmelita Hinton, was the founder of The Putney School in Putney, Vermont.

Chase died at the age of 86 on 22 December 1986 in Santa Fe, New Mexico. When she died she had five children that survived her: Mansi Kern a well=known folk musician in Santa Fe and Tewuque, New Mexico, Dr. Harry McClure Johnson a scientist in Maryland and Washington DC, Elizabeth Stickney a teacher in Hartford, Connecticut, Sarah Jane Shaw who raises Arabian horses in Bozeman, Montana, and Priscilla McClure Paetsch a prominent violinist in Colorado Springs. She also had 22 grandchildren and several great grandchildren

Ancestry

Helena Modjeska Chase Johnson Drea was a direct descendant of several Mayflower pilgrims. 

On her mothers side, Lula Belle Edwards Chase was a direct line descendant from five people who came over to America on the ship called the Mayflower, including among them Governor William Bradford, John Howland and Elizabeth Tilley who came to the New World on the English ship in 1620. 

After surviving the treacherous transatlantic crossing in the Mayflower, William Bradford became Governor and was one of the 41 Pilgrims who signed the Mayflower Compact in 1620 while still aboard the ship.

References

1900 births
1986 deaths
20th-century American women artists